Sardis (also known as Sardis Cross) is a small village in the community and parish of Burton, Pembrokeshire, Wales   east of Rosemarket.

Worship

Sardis Baptist Chapel was built in 1822. The minister for Pembroke Dock, quoted in an 1851 religious census, described the congregation as scattered, with the weather sometimes greatly affecting attendance.

Armed robbery
An armed robbery in the village helped lead to the apprehension and eventual conviction of serial killer John Cooper for murders committed in the 1980s.

References

Villages in Pembrokeshire